Fétique is a French surname. Notable people with the surname include:

Fétique (bow makers)
Charles Claude Fétique (1853–1911) a violin maker
Victor Fétique (1872–1933) son
Jules Fétique (1875–1951) son
Marcel Fétique (1899–1977) grandson
André Richaume (1905–1966) grandson

French-language surnames